Dean Martin (born Dino Paul Crocetti; June 7, 1917 – December 25, 1995) was an American singer, actor, and comedian. One of the most popular and enduring American entertainers of the mid-20th century, Martin was nicknamed "The King of Cool." Martin gained his career breakthrough together with comedian Jerry Lewis, billed as Martin and Lewis, in 1946. They performed in nightclubs and later had numerous appearances on radio, television and in films.

Following an acrimonious ending of the partnership in 1956, Martin pursued a solo career as a performer and actor. Martin established himself as a singer, recording numerous contemporary songs as well as standards from the Great American Songbook. He became one of the most popular acts in Las Vegas and was known for his friendship with fellow artists Frank Sinatra and Sammy Davis Jr., who together with several others formed the Rat Pack.

Starting in 1965, Martin was the host of the television variety program The Dean Martin Show, which centered on Martin's singing and comedic talents and was characterized by his relaxed, easy-going demeanor. From 1974 to 1984, he was roastmaster on the popular Dean Martin Celebrity Roast, which drew celebrities, comedians and politicians. Throughout his career, Martin performed in concert stages, nightclubs, audio recordings and appeared in 85 film and television productions.

His best known songs include "Ain't That a Kick in the Head?," "Memories Are Made of This," "That's Amore," "Everybody Loves Somebody," "You're Nobody till Somebody Loves You," "Sway," and "Volare."

Early life

Martin was born Dino Paul Crocetti on June 7, 1917, in Steubenville, Ohio, to Italian father Gaetano Alfonso Crocetti (1894–1967) and Italian-American mother Angela Crocetti (née Barra; 1897–1966). His father, who was a barber, was originally from Montesilvano, Pescara, and his mother was born December 18, 1897, in Fernwood, Ohio. Angela's father, Domenico Barra, immigrated from Monasterolo del Castello, Bergamo. Martin had an older brother named Guglielmo "William" Antonio Crocetti (1916–1968). His first language was Italian and he spoke no English until he started school at the age of five. He attended Grant Elementary School in Steubenville, where he was bullied for his broken English. As a teenager, he played the drums as a hobby. He dropped out of Steubenville High School in the tenth grade because, according to Martin, he thought he was smarter than his teachers. He bootlegged liquor, worked in a steel mill, served as a croupier at a speakeasy and a blackjack dealer, and was a welterweight boxer.

At 15 he billed himself as "Kid Crochet". His prizefighting earned him a broken nose (later straightened), a scarred lip, many broken knuckles (a result of not being able to afford tape used to wrap boxers' hands), and a bruised body. Of his 12 bouts, he said that he "won all but 11". For a time, he shared a New York City apartment with Sonny King, who was also starting in show business and had little money. The two reportedly charged people to watch them bare-knuckle box each other in their apartment, fighting until one was knocked out. Martin knocked out King in the first round of an amateur boxing match. Martin gave up boxing to work as a roulette stickman and croupier in an illegal casino behind a tobacco shop, where he had started as a stock boy. At the same time, he sang with local bands, calling himself "Dino Martini" (after the Metropolitan Opera tenor Nino Martini). He got his break working for the Ernie McKay Orchestra. He sang in a crooning style influenced by Harry Mills of the Mills Brothers and Perry Como. By late 1940 he had begun singing for Cleveland bandleader Sammy Watkins, who suggested he change his name to Dean Martin. He stayed with Watkins until at least May 1943. By fall 1943 he had begun performing in New York. Martin was drafted into the military in World War II but after 14 months he was discharged due to a hernia.

In October 1941, Martin married Elizabeth "Betty" Anne McDonald in Cleveland, and the couple had an apartment in Cleveland Heights for a while. They eventually had four children before the marriage ended in 1949.

Career

Teaming with Jerry Lewis

Martin attracted the attention of Metro-Goldwyn-Mayer and Columbia Pictures, but a Hollywood contract was not forthcoming. He met comic Jerry Lewis at the Glass Hat Club in New York, where both were performing. Martin and Lewis formed a fast friendship which led to their participation in each other's acts and the formation of a music-comedy team. Their debut together occurred at Atlantic City's 500 Club on July 24, 1946, and they were not well received. The owner, Skinny D'Amato, warned them that if they did not come up with a better act for their second show that night, they would be fired. Huddling in the alley behind the club, Lewis and Martin agreed to "go for broke", they divided their act between songs, skits, and ad-libbed material. Martin sang and Lewis dressed as a busboy, dropping plates and making a shambles of Martin's performance and the club's decorum until Lewis was chased from the room as Martin pelted him with bread rolls.

They performed slapstick, reeled off old vaudeville jokes and did whatever else popped into their heads. The audience laughed. This success led to a series of well-paying engagements on the Eastern seaboard, culminating in a run at New York's Copacabana. The act consisted of Lewis interrupting and heckling Martin while he was trying to sing, with the two ultimately chasing each other around the stage. The secret, both said, is that they ignored the audience and played to each other. The team made its television debut on the first broadcast of CBS-TV network's The Ed Sullivan Show (then called The Toast Of The Town) on June 20, 1948, with composers Rodgers and Hammerstein also appearing. Hoping to improve their act, the two hired young comedy writers Norman Lear and Ed Simmons to write their bits. With the assistance of both Lear and Simmons, the two would take their act beyond nightclubs.

A radio series began in 1949, the year Martin and Lewis signed with Paramount producer Hal B. Wallis as comedy relief for the movie My Friend Irma. Their agent, Abby Greshler, negotiated one of Hollywood's best deals: although they received only $75,000 between them for their films with Wallis, Martin and Lewis were free to do one outside film a year, which they would co-produce through their own York Productions.

They also controlled their club, record, radio, and television appearances, and through these they earned millions of dollars. In Dean & Me, Lewis calls Martin one of the great comic geniuses of all time. They were friends, as well, with Lewis acting as best man when Martin remarried in 1949. But harsh comments from critics, as well as frustration with the similarity of Martin and Lewis movies, which producer Hal Wallis refused to change, led to Martin's dissatisfaction. He put less enthusiasm into the work, leading to escalating arguments with Lewis. Martin told his partner he was "nothing to [him] but a dollar sign". The act broke up in 1956, ten years to the day from the first teaming.

Solo career

Martin's first solo film, Ten Thousand Bedrooms (1957), was a box-office failure. Although "Volare" reached number fifteen in the U.S. and number 2 in the UK, the era of the pop crooner was waning with the advent of rock and roll. Martin wanted to become a dramatic actor, known for more than slapstick comedy films. Though offered a fraction of his former salary to co-star in a war drama, The Young Lions (1958), his part would be with Marlon Brando and Montgomery Clift. Tony Randall already had the part, but talent agency MCA realized that with this film, Martin would become a triple threat: they could make money from his work in nightclubs, films, and records. Randall was paid off to relinquish the role, Martin replaced him and the film turned out to be the beginning of Martin's comeback. Martin starred alongside Frank Sinatra for the first time in the Vincente Minnelli drama, Some Came Running (1958).
 
By the mid-1960s, Martin was a movie, recording, television, and nightclub star. Martin was acclaimed as Dude in Rio Bravo (1959), directed by Howard Hawks and also starring John Wayne and singer Ricky Nelson. He teamed again with Wayne in The Sons of Katie Elder (1965), cast as brothers. In 1960, Martin was cast in the film version of the Judy Holliday stage musical comedy Bells Are Ringing. He won a Golden Globe nomination for his performance in the 1960 film comedy Who Was That Lady? but continued to seek dramatic roles, portraying a Southern politician in 1961's Ada, and starring in 1963's screen adaptation of an intense stage drama, Toys in the Attic, opposite Geraldine Page, as well as in 1970's drama Airport with Burt Lancaster, a huge box-office success.

Sinatra and he teamed up for several more movies, the crime caper Ocean's 11, the musical Robin and the 7 Hoods, and the Western comedies Sergeants 3 and 4 for Texas, often with their Rat Pack pals such as Sammy Davis, Jr., Peter Lawford, and Joey Bishop, as well as a romantic comedy, Marriage on the Rocks. Martin also co-starred with Shirley MacLaine in a number of films, including Some Came Running, Artists and Models, Career, All in a Night's Work, and What a Way to Go! He played a satiric variation of his own womanizing persona as Las Vegas singer "Dino" in Billy Wilder's comedy Kiss Me, Stupid (1964) with Kim Novak, and he poked fun at his image in films such as the Matt Helm spy spoofs of the 1960s, in which he was a co-producer. In the third Matt Helm film The Ambushers (1967), Helm, about to be executed, receives a last cigarette and tells the provider, "I'll remember you from the great beyond," continuing sotto voce, "somewhere around Steubenville, I hope."

As a singer, Martin copied the styles of Harry Mills (of the Mills Brothers), Bing Crosby, and Perry Como until he developed his own and could hold his own in duets with Sinatra and Crosby. Like Sinatra, he could not read music, but he recorded more than 100 albums and 600 songs. His signature tune, "Everybody Loves Somebody", knocked the Beatles' "A Hard Day's Night" off number one in the United States in 1964. This was followed by "The Door is Still Open to My Heart", which reached number six that year. Elvis Presley was said to have been a fan of Martin, and patterned his performance of "Love Me Tender" after Martin's style. Martin, like Elvis, was influenced by country music. By 1965, some of Martin's albums, such as Dean "Tex" Martin Rides Again, Houston, Welcome to My World, and Gentle on My Mind, were composed of country and western songs by artists such as Johnny Cash, Merle Haggard, and Buck Owens. Martin often hosted country performers on his TV show and was named "Man Of the Year" by the Country Music Association in 1966. The final album of his recording career was 1983's The Nashville Sessions.

The image of Martin as a Vegas entertainer in a tuxedo has been an enduring one. "Ain't That a Kick in the Head?", a song Martin performed in Ocean's 11, did not become a hit at the time, but has enjoyed a revival in the media and pop culture and has been his most frequently played song in media for two decades. For three decades, Martin was among the most popular acts in Las Vegas. Martin sang and was one of the smoothest comics in the business, benefiting from the decade of comedy with Lewis. Martin's daughter, Gail, also sang in Vegas and on many TV shows including his, co-hosting his summer replacement series on NBC. Daughter Deana Martin continues to perform, as did youngest son Ricci Martin until his death in August 2016. Eldest son Craig was a producer on Martin's television show and daughter Claudia was an actress in films such as For Those Who Think Young. Though often thought of as a ladies' man, Martin spent a lot of time with his family; as second wife Jeanne put it, prior to the couple's divorce, "He was home every night for dinner."

Rat Pack

As Martin's solo career grew, he and Frank Sinatra became friends. In the late 1950s and early 1960s, Martin and Sinatra, along with friends Joey Bishop, Peter Lawford, and Sammy Davis Jr. formed the Rat Pack, so-called after an earlier group of social friends, the Holmby Hills Rat Pack centered on Humphrey Bogart and Lauren Bacall, of which Sinatra had been a member (The Martin-Sinatra-Davis-Lawford-Bishop group referred to themselves as "The Summit" or "The Clan" and never as "The Rat Pack", although this has remained their identity in popular imagination). The men made films together, formed part of the Hollywood social scene, and were politically influential (through Lawford's marriage to Patricia Kennedy, sister of President John F. Kennedy).

The Rat Pack was legendary for its Las Vegas Strip performances. For example, the marquee at the Sands Hotel might read "DEAN MARTIN—MAYBE FRANK—MAYBE SAMMY." Their appearances were valuable because the city would flood with wealthy gamblers. Their act (always in tuxedo) consisted of each singing individual numbers, duets and trios, along with seemingly improvised slapstick and chatter. In the socially charged 1960s, their jokes revolved around adult themes, such as Sinatra's womanizing and Martin's drinking, as well as Davis's race and religion. Sinatra and Martin supported the civil rights movement and refused to perform in clubs that would not allow African-American or Jewish performers. Posthumously, the Rat Pack has experienced a popular revival, inspiring the George Clooney/Brad Pitt Ocean's Trilogy.

The Dean Martin Show

In 1965, Martin launched his weekly NBC comedy-variety series, The Dean Martin Show, which ran for 264 episodes until 1974. He won a Golden Globe Award for Best Actor - Television Series Musical or Comedy in 1966 and was nominated again the following three years. The show exploited his image as a carefree boozer. Martin capitalized on his laid-back persona of the half-drunk crooner, hitting on women with remarks that would get anyone else slapped, and making snappy if slurred remarks about fellow celebrities during his roasts. During an interview on the British TV documentary Wine, Women and Song, aired in 1983, he stated, perhaps tongue-in-cheek, that he had someone record them on cassette tape so he could listen to them. His TV show was a success. The show's loose format featured quick-witted improvization from Martin and his weekly guests. This prompted a battle between Martin and NBC censors, who insisted on more scrutiny of the content. He later had trouble with NBC for his off-the-cuff use of obscene Italian phrases, which brought complaints from viewers who spoke the language. The show was often in the Top Ten. Martin, appreciative of the show's producer, his friend Greg Garrison, made a handshake deal giving Garrison, a pioneer TV producer in the 1950s, 50% of the show. However, the validity of that ownership is the subject of a lawsuit brought by NBCUniversal.

Despite Martin's reputation as a drinker—perpetuated via his vanity license plate "DRUNKY"—his alcohol use was quite disciplined. He was often the first to call it a night and, when not on tour or on a film location, liked to go home to see his wife and children. He borrowed the lovable-drunk shtick from Joe E. Lewis, but his convincing portrayals of heavy boozers in Some Came Running and Howard Hawks's Rio Bravo led to unsubstantiated claims of alcoholism. Martin starred in and co-produced four Matt Helm superspy comedy adventures during this time, as well as a number of Westerns. By the early 1970s, The Dean Martin Show was still earning solid ratings, and although he was no longer a Top 40 hitmaker, his record albums continued to sell. He found a way to make his passion for golf profitable by offering a signature line of golf balls, and the Dean Martin Tucson Open was an event on golf's PGA Tour from 1972 to 1975. At his death, Martin was reportedly the single largest minority shareholder of RCA stock.

Now comfortable financially, Martin began reducing his schedule. The final (1973–1974) season of his variety show was retooled into one of celebrity roasts, requiring less involvement. In the roasts, Martin and his panel of pals made fun of a variety of popular entertainment, athletic, and political figures. After the show's cancellation, NBC continued to air The Dean Martin Celebrity Roast as a series of TV specials through 1984.

Later career

For nearly a decade, Martin had recorded as many as four albums a year for Reprise Records. Martin recorded his final Reprise album, Once in a While in 1974, which was not issued until 1978. His final recordings were made for Warner Bros. Records. The Nashville Sessions was released in 1983, from which he had a hit with "(I Think That I Just Wrote) My First Country Song", which was recorded with Conway Twitty and made a respectable showing on the country charts. A follow-up single, "L.A. Is My Home"/"Drinking Champagne", came in 1985. The 1974 film drama Mr. Ricco marked Martin's final starring role, in which he played a criminal defense lawyer.

In 1972, he filed for divorce from his second wife, Jeanne. A week later, his business partnership with the Riviera hotel in Las Vegas dissolved amid reports of the casino's refusal to agree to Martin's request to perform only once a night. He joined the MGM Grand Hotel and Casino, where he was the featured performer on the hotel's opening night of December 23, 1973, and his contract required him to star in a film (Mr. Ricco) for Metro-Goldwyn-Mayer studios. Less than a month after his second marriage had dissolved, Martin, at 55, married 26-year-old Catherine Hawn on April 25, 1973. Hawn had been the receptionist at the chic Gene Shacove hair salon in Beverly Hills. They divorced November 10, 1976. He was also briefly engaged to Gail Renshaw, Miss World–U.S. 1969. Eventually, Martin reconciled with Jeanne, though they never remarried.

Martin also made a public reconciliation with Lewis on his partner's Labor Day telethon, benefiting the Muscular Dystrophy Association, in September 1976. Sinatra shocked Lewis by bringing Martin out on stage and as the two men embraced, the audience gave them a standing ovation and the phones lit up, resulting in one of the telethon's most profitable years up to that time. Lewis later reported the event was one of the three most memorable of his life. Lewis quipped, "So, you working?" Martin, playing drunk, replied that he was appearing "at the 'Meggum'" (meaning the MGM Grand Hotel). This, with the death of Martin's son Dean Paul Martin more than a decade later, helped bring the two men together. They maintained a quiet friendship, but only performed again once, in 1989, on Martin's 72nd birthday.

Martin returned to films briefly with appearances in the star-laden, critically panned but commercially successful The Cannonball Run and its sequel Cannonball Run II. He also had a minor hit single with "Since I Met You Baby" and made his first music video, which appeared on MTV and was created by Martin's youngest son, Ricci. On March 21, 1987, Martin's son, actor Dean Paul Martin (formerly Dino of the 1960s "teeny-bopper" rock group Dino, Desi & Billy), died when his F-4 Phantom II jet fighter crashed while flying with the California Air National Guard. Martin's grief over his son's death left him depressed and demoralized. Lewis stated in an on-stage interview in 2005 that subsequent to his son's death Martin became a reclusive alcoholic. Later, a tour with Davis and Sinatra in 1988, undertaken in part to help Martin recover, sputtered.

Martin, who responded best to a club audience, felt lost in the huge stadiums they were performing in at Sinatra's insistence, and he was not interested in drinking until dawn after performances. His final Vegas shows were at Bally's Hotel in 1991. At Bally's, he had his final reunion with Lewis on his 72nd birthday. Martin's last two TV appearances involved tributes to his former Rat Pack members. On December 8, 1989, he joined stars in Sammy Davis Jr's 60th anniversary celebration, which aired a few weeks before Davis died from throat cancer. In December 1990, Martin congratulated Sinatra on his 75th birthday special.
Following his diagnosis of lung cancer at Cedars Sinai Medical Center on September 16, 1993, Martin finally quit smoking.

Personal life
Martin was married three times. He wed Elizabeth Anne "Betty" McDonald, (July 14, 1922 – July 11, 1989) of Ridley Park, Pennsylvania in 1941. The couple had four children:
 Craig Martin (born 1942).
 Claudia Martin (March 16, 1944 – February 16, 2001).
 Gail Martin (born 1945).
 Deana Martin (born 1948).

Martin and McDonald divorced in 1949 and Dean gained custody of their children. McDonald lived out her life in relative obscurity in San Francisco, California.

Martin next married Dorothy Jean "Jeanne" Biegger (March 27, 1927 – August 24, 2016), a former Orange Bowl queen from Coral Gables, Florida. Their marriage lasted 24 years (1949–1973) and produced three children:
 Dean Paul Martin (November 17, 1951 – March 21, 1987).
 Ricci Martin (September 20, 1953 – August 3, 2016).
 Gina Martin (born 1956).

Martin last wed Catherine Hawn (born 1947), a union which lasted three years before Martin initiated divorce proceedings. They had no biological children of their own but Martin adopted Hawn's daughter, Sasha. After their divorce, Martin had a brief relationship with model and longtime friend Pat Sheehan.

Martin's uncle was Leonard Barr, who appeared in several of his shows. In the 1960s and early 1970s Martin lived at 363 Copa De Oro Road in Bel Air, Los Angeles, before selling it to Tom Jones for $500,000 in June 1976.

Martin's son-in-law was the Beach Boys' Carl Wilson, who married Martin's daughter Gina. Figure skater Dorothy Hamill and actress Olivia Hussey were his daughters-in-law during their marriages to Martin's son, Dean Paul Martin. Craig, Martin's elder son, was married to Lou Costello's daughter Carole (1938-1987) until her death from a stroke at age 48.

Dean Martin bred Purebred Andalusian Horses at his Hidden Valley Ranch, Thousand Oaks Ventura County, California.

Martin volunteered to perform fundraisers for the Bergson Group in the late 1940s.

Although a Republican, Martin supported Democratic candidate Lyndon B. Johnson in 1964.

Illness and death

Martin, a lifelong heavy smoker, was diagnosed with lung cancer at Cedars Sinai Medical Center in September 1993. He was told that he would require surgery to prolong his life, but he rejected it. He retired from public life in early 1995 and died of acute respiratory failure resulting from emphysema at his Beverly Hills home on Christmas Day, 1995 (29 years to the day after his own mother died), at age 78. The lights of the Las Vegas Strip were dimmed in his honor. Martin was interred at the Westwood Village Memorial Park Cemetery in Los Angeles. The crypt features the epitaph "Everybody Loves Somebody Sometime", the title of his signature song.

Tributes and legacy
In 1997, Ohio Route 7 through Steubenville was rededicated as Dean Martin Boulevard. Road signs bearing an Al Hirschfeld caricature of Martin's likeness designate the stretch with a historical marker bearing a small picture and brief biography in the Gazebo Park at Route 7 and North Fourth Street. An annual Dean Martin Festival celebration is held in Steubenville. Impersonators, friends and family, and entertainers, many of Italian ancestry, appear. In 2005, Clark County, Nevada, renamed a portion of Industrial Road as Dean Martin Drive. A similarly named street was dedicated in 2008 in Rancho Mirage, California. Martin's family was presented a gold record in 2004 for Dino: The Essential Dean Martin, his fastest-selling album, which also hit the iTunes Top 10, and in 2006 it was certified "Platinum".

For the week ending December 23, 2006, the Dean Martin and Martina McBride duet of "Baby, It's Cold Outside" reached No. 7 on the R&R AC chart. It also went to No. 36 on the R&R Country chart – the last time Martin had a song this high in the charts was in 1965, with the song "I Will", which reached No. 10 on the Pop chart. An album of duets, Forever Cool, was released by Capitol/EMI in 2007. It features Martin's voice with Kevin Spacey, Shelby Lynne, Joss Stone, Big Bad Voodoo Daddy, Robbie Williams, McBride and others. His footprints were immortalized at Grauman's Chinese Theatre in 1964. Martin has three stars on the Hollywood Walk of Fame: one at 6519 Hollywood Boulevard for movies; the second at 1617 Vine for recordings; and a third at 6651 Hollywood Boulevard for television. In February 2009, Martin was honored with a posthumous Grammy Lifetime Achievement Award. Four of his surviving children, Gail, Deana, Ricci and Gina accepted it on his behalf. In 2010, Martin received a posthumous star on the Italian Walk of Fame in Toronto, Ontario, Canada.

The town of origin of Dean's father, Montesilvano, dedicated to him a square between via Sarca and via Torrente Piomba and a congress palace called Pala Dean Martin congress center in via Aldo Moro adjacent to the Porto Allegro structure (former cinema Warner).

In popular culture

A number of Martin songs have been featured across popular culture for decades. Hits such as "Ain't That a Kick in the Head", "Sway", "You're Nobody Till Somebody Loves You", "That's Amore", and Martin's signature song "Everybody Loves Somebody" have been in films (such as the Oscar-winning Logorama, A Bronx Tale, Casino, Goodfellas, Payback, Mission: Impossible – Ghost Protocol, Sexy Beast, Moonstruck, Vegas Vacation, Swingers, and Return to Me), television series (such as American Dad!, Friends, The Sopranos, House MD, Samurai Jack, and The Fresh Prince of Bel-Air), video games (such as The Godfather: The Game, The Godfather II, Fallout: New Vegas, and Mafia II), and fashion shows (such as the 2008 Victoria's Secret Fashion Show).

Danny Gans portrayed Martin in the 1992 CBS miniseries Sinatra. Martin was portrayed by Joe Mantegna in the 1998 HBO movie about Sinatra and Martin titled The Rat Pack. Mantegna was nominated for both an Emmy Award and a Golden Globe Award for the role. British actor Jeremy Northam portrayed the entertainer in the 2002 made-for-TV movie Martin and Lewis, alongside Will & Grace Sean Hayes as Jerry Lewis.

Martin is the subject of Dean Martin's Wild Party and Dean Martin's Vegas Shindig, a pair of video slot machines found in many casinos. The games feature songs sung by Martin during the bonus feature and the count-up of a player's winnings. A compilation album called Amore! debuted at Number One on Billboard magazine's Top Pop Catalog Albums chart in its February 21, 2009, issue.

In 1998, The MTV animated show Celebrity Deathmatch had a clay-animated fight to the death between Martin and comedian Jerry Lewis. Martin wins by whacking Jerry out of the ring. The Rat Pack: Live from Las Vegas has been a successful tribute show, featuring Martin impersonators, on stage in Europe and North America since 2000.  The popular Las Vegas show, "The Rat Pack is Back" has played The Copa Room at the Tuscany Suites Casino for several years.  The walk-up song for Francisco Cervelli, a catcher for the Atlanta Braves, is the Dean Martin tune "That's Amore". In DePatie-Freleng's animated theatrical cartoon series The Ant and the Aardvark, the Ant's voice was performed by John Byner as an imitation of Martin.

Martin appears as Matt Helm in Quentin Tarantino's 2019 period piece Once Upon A Time in Hollywood. Sharon Tate (played by Margot Robbie) goes to a cinema to see The Wrecking Crew.

Discography
The list below shows the singer's studio albums only. His full discography, singles, compilations and other releases are described in a separate article.

Dean Martin Sings (1953)
Swingin' Down Yonder (1955)
Pretty Baby (1957)
Sleep Warm (1959)
A Winter Romance (1959)
This Time I'm Swingin'! (1960)
Dino: Italian Love Songs (1962)
French Style (1962)
Cha Cha de Amor (1962)
Dino Latino (1962)
Dean "Tex" Martin: Country Style (1963)
Dean "Tex" Martin Rides Again (1963)
Reprise Musical Repertory Theatre (1963)
Robin and the 7 Hoods (1964)
Dream with Dean (1964)
The Door Is Still Open to My Heart (1964)
Dean Martin Hits Again (1965)
(Remember Me) I'm the One Who Loves You (1965)

Houston (1965)
Somewhere There's a Someone (1966)
Dean Martin Sings Songs from "The Silencers" (1966)
The Hit Sound of Dean Martin (1966)
The Dean Martin Christmas Album (1966)
The Dean Martin TV Show (1966)
Happiness Is Dean Martin (1967)
Welcome to My World (1967)
Gentle on My Mind (1968)
I Take a Lot of Pride in What I Am (1969)
My Woman My Woman My Wife (1970)
For the Good Times (1971)
Dino (1972)
Sittin' on Top of the World (1973)
You're the Best Thing That Ever Happened to Me (1973)
Once in a While (1978)
The Nashville Sessions (1983)

Filmography

Film

Television

References

Sources

Further reading
 Arthur Marx. Everybody Loves Somebody Sometime (Especially Himself): The story of Dean Martin and Jerry Lewis, New York, NY: Hawthorn Books, 1974, 
 Smith, John L. The Animal in Hollywood: Anthony Fiato's Life in the Mafia. Barricade Books, New York, 1998.

External links

 
 Dean Martin Fan Center
 Dean Martin at The Biography Channel
 Cleveland.com: Homegrown Heroes: Dean Martin Timeline
 Dean Works the room at the Sands 
 Dean Martin biography/discography on The Interlude Era site

 
Dean Martin
1917 births
1995 deaths
20th-century American comedians
20th-century American male actors
20th-century American singers
American baritones
American country singers
American crooners
American jazz singers
American male boxers
American male comedians
American male comedy actors
American male film actors
American male jazz musicians
American male pop singers
American male radio actors
American male singers
American male television actors
American military personnel of World War II
American people of Italian descent
American stand-up comedians
Burials at Westwood Village Memorial Park Cemetery
California Republicans
Capitol Records artists
Catholics from Ohio
Comedians from Ohio
Country musicians from California
Country musicians from Ohio
Country musicians from Pennsylvania
Deaths from emphysema
Deaths from lung cancer in California
Deaths from respiratory failure
Jazz musicians from Ohio
Male actors from California
Male actors from Ohio
Male Western (genre) film actors
Nightclub performers
Ohio Republicans
Paramount Pictures contract players
People from Steubenville, Ohio
People of Abruzzese descent
Reprise Records artists
Singers from Ohio
Singers from Pennsylvania
Traditional pop music singers
Vaudeville performers